Yus Arfandy Djafar (born 11 January 1987) is an Indonesian footballer who plays for Persiba in Liga 2 as a midfielder. He previously played for PSM Makassar, Persidafon, Mitra Kukar, Bontang FC, Persiba, Persisam, Persiram and Persita

References

Living people
1987 births
Indonesian footballers
Sportspeople from Makassar
Liga 1 (Indonesia) players
PSM Makassar players
Persidafon Dafonsoro players
Mitra Kukar players
Bontang F.C. players
Persiba Balikpapan players
Persisam Putra Samarinda players
Persiram Raja Ampat players
Persita Tangerang players
Gresik United players
Association football midfielders